Kevin Richard Parsons (May 9, 1930 – March 10, 2013) was a Canadian politician. He represented the electoral district of Cape St. Francis in the Newfoundland and Labrador House of Assembly from 1986 to 1993. He is a member of the Progressive Conservative Party of Newfoundland and Labrador. He was born at Flatrock, Newfoundland. He was also a former mayor of his hometown.

References

1930 births
2013 deaths
Progressive Conservative Party of Newfoundland and Labrador MHAs